is a Japanese sociologist and is the Hanna Holborn Gray Professor of sociology at the University of Chicago.

Selected bibliography

Books

Journal article

Papers

Honours 
Person of Cultural Merit (2020)

References

External links
 Profile Page: Kazuo Yamaguchi The University of Chicago
 CV

Japanese sociologists
University of Chicago alumni
University of Chicago faculty
Columbia University faculty
1946 births
Living people
Persons of Cultural Merit